Aghamore is a townland in County Leitrim, Ireland, located on the main N4 national primary road between Dublin and Sligo.

See also
List of towns and villages in Ireland

References

Towns and villages in County Leitrim